The Tenka, also known as Tenke, is a river in Magadan Oblast, Russian Far East. The river flows across the Tenkinsky District, which is named after it.

Course 
The Tenka flows through the Upper Kolyma Highlands. It heads first roughly northwards, then when it is joined by the Omchak from the left it flows southeastwards, passing near Transportny. Further downstream it bends again and flows northwards until its mouth. 

See also
List of rivers of Russia

References

External links
Kolyma - Modern Guidebook to Magadan Oblast 

Rivers of Magadan Oblast